Peter D. Weaver (born 15 January 1945) is a retired bishop of The United Methodist Church.

Education
Weaver was educated at West Virginia Wesleyan College where he earned a B.A. in 1966. He then earned a M.Div. at Drew University in 1969 and became a Doctor of Theology in 1975 after concluding studies at Boston University. Weaver also holds honorary doctorates from Lebanon Valley College (1999), Albright College (2000), and West Virginia Wesleyan College (2007).

Ordained ministry
Before election to the episcopacy, Weaver served the Western Pennsylvania Conference as a pastor.  He entered the ministry in 1967 as a deacon by Lloyd Christ Wicke and was ordained an elder by Roy Calvin Nichols in 1969. He held appointments as:
Pastor, Whitaker United Methodist Church, 1971–77
Senior Pastor, Smithfield United Church (UCC and UMC), Pittsburgh, PA, 1977–88
Senior Pastor, First United Methodist Church, Pittsburgh, PA, 1988–96
Adjunct Faculty, Drew Theological School, 1980
Faculty, Pittsburgh Theological Seminary, 1990

Episcopal ministry

He was elected a bishop of the United Methodist Church by the Northeastern Jurisdictional Conference in 1996. He was then appointed as the resident bishop to various Annual Conferences:

 Philadelphia Area (Eastern Pennsylvania and Peninsula Delaware Conferences) (1996-2004)
 Boston Episcopal Area (New England Annual Conference) (2004-12)

Weaver served his colleagues as President of the UMC Council of Bishops (2003–04). He was the first president bishop since the council increased the office's term to two years. He later served as Executive Secretary to the Council of Bishops (2012-16).

Weaver now serves as the Bishop-in-Residence at Drew University Theological School.

Weaver served as interim bishop of the Virginia Annual Conference in 2019 to cover Bishop Lewis' medical leave.

See also
 List of bishops of the United Methodist Church

References

1945 births
Living people
West Virginia Wesleyan College alumni
Boston University School of Theology alumni
United Methodist bishops of the Northeastern Jurisdiction
20th-century Methodist bishops